Fluorosulfonate, in organic chemistry, is a functional group that has the chemical formula F-SO2-R, and typically is a very good leaving group. In organic chemistry, fluorosulfonate is different than fluorosulfate. In fluorosulfonates, sulfur atom is directly bonded to a non-oxygen atom such as carbon. In inorganic chemistry, fluorosulfonate is another term for fluorosulfate, the anion F-SO2-O−, the conjugate base of fluorosulfonic acid. They form a series of salts with metal and organic cations called fluorosulfates.

Organic (alkyl) fluorosulfonates are usually strong alkylation agents, similar to triflate esters (F3C-SO2-OR). But unlike the triflate group, the fluorosulfonate group is not stable against hydrolysis. Therefore, fluorosulfonate esters are less frequently used as alkylation agents than triflate esters.

See also
 Fluorosulfite
 Methyl fluorosulfonate

References

Functional groups
Leaving groups
Sulfonates